James Arthur Margolis (born July 17, 1936) is an American Olympic épée fencer.

Early life
Margolis was born in New York, New York, and is Jewish. His brother Don also fenced for Columbia University, coming in third in the NCAA nationals in épée in 1963.  He later lived in Teaneck, New Jersey.

Fencing career
He fenced for the Columbia Lions fencing team.  Margolis was the 1957 NCAA épée champion, as well as the 1957 IFA champion, fencing as a junior for Columbia University, from which he graduated in 1958.  He was All-Ivy League in 1957 and 1958, All-American in 1957, and Eastern Champion in épée in 1957. He then joined the U.S. Navy, and became a Lieutenant.

In 1960, Margolis placed third in epee at the Amateur Fencers League of America (AFLA) national tournament.

Margolis also competed on behalf of the United States in the individual and team épée events at the 1960 Summer Olympics in Rome.  He was the Ivy League's first Olympian in fencing.

He competed in the 1960 Pan American Games. Margolis won a gold medal in team  épée at the 1963 Pan American Games.

Margolis was inducted into the Columbia University Athletics Hall of Fame.

After his fencing career concluded, Margolis worked in the life insurance business for 40 years, and served as manager at the Brookline Emergency Food Pantry, a food shelter for individuals, families, and seniors in need.

References

External links
 

1936 births
Living people
Sportspeople from New York City
People from Teaneck, New Jersey
American male épée fencers
Olympic fencers of the United States
Fencers at the 1960 Summer Olympics
Sportspeople from New York (state)
Pan American Games medalists in fencing
Pan American Games gold medalists for the United States
Fencers at the 1963 Pan American Games
Jewish male épée fencers
Jewish American sportspeople
Columbia Lions fencers
United States Navy officers
21st-century American Jews
Military personnel from New Jersey
Medalists at the 1963 Pan American Games